Médina Gounass is a rural community of Bonconto Arrondissement in the Vélingara Department, Kolda Region, Senegal.

Notable people
Notable people:
Cherif Mohamed Aly Aidara, founder of the international NGO Mozdahir

Climate
Médina Gounass has a tropical savanna climate (Aw) with no rainfall from November to May and heavy rainfall from June to October.

References

Kolda Region
Communes of Senegal